The term romance has a centuries-long history. Applied to narrative ballads in Spain, it came to be used by the 18th century for simple lyrical pieces not only for voice, but also for instruments alone. The Oxford Dictionary of Music states that "generally it implies a specially personal or tender quality".

Instrumental music bearing the title "Romance" 
Typically, a Classical piece or movement called a "Romance" is in three, meaning three beats in the bar
 Beethoven: two violin romances (Romanzen) for violin and orchestra, No. 1 G major, Op. 40; No. 2 in F major, Op. 50 take the form of a loose theme and variations
 Johannes Brahms: Romanze in F major for piano, Op. 118, No. 5 (1893)
 Max Bruch: "Romance for Viola and Orchestra in F"
 Arthur Butterworth: Romanza for horn and string quartet with double bass ad libitum (or piano), Op. 12 (1951)
 Antonín Dvořák: Romance in F minor for violin and orchestra, Op. 11 (1873/1877)
 Edward Elgar: 
Romance for bassoon and orchestra, Op. 62 (1910)
Enigma Variation XIII (Romanza: Moderato)
 Edvard Grieg: String Quartet No. 1 in G minor, Op. 27 (1878), second movement
 Erich Wolfgang Korngold: Romance from Concerto for violin and orchestra, second movement
 Miguel Llobet: Romanza
 Wolfgang Amadeus Mozart: Romanze from Eine Kleine Nachtmusik, the second movement; Piano Concerto No. 20, second movement
 Joseph Haydn: "Romance: Allegretto" from Symphony No. 85 in B, "La Reine," the second movement
 Romanza (Paganini-Ponce)
 Camille Saint-Saëns: 
 Romance in D-flat major for flute and piano (or orchestra), Op. 37 (1871)
 Romance in D major for cello and orchestra, Op. 51 (1877)
 Clara Schumann: Drei Romanzen for violin and piano, Op. 22 (1853)
 Robert Schumann: Drei Romanzen (for piano), Op. 28 (1839)
 Robert Schumann: Drei Romanzen (for oboe or violin and piano), Op. 94 (1849)
 Dmitri Shostakovich: Romance from The Gadfly Suite
 Jean Sibelius: Romances for piano Op 24, Nos. 2, 5, and 9; Op. 78, No. 2
 Johan Svendsen: Romance for violin and orchestra, Op. 26 (1881)
 Ralph Vaughan Williams: Romanza, in his Tuba Concerto (1954), and Romance for viola and piano (unknown)
 Anonymous: "Romance/Romanza" for the classical guitar, known variously as Spanish Romance, Romance D'Amour, etc.

Mozart subtitled the second movement of his piano concerto no. 20 in D minor (K.466) "Romanze" and his Horn Concerto has a Romance and Rondo.

Liszt wrote a Romance in E minor in 1842 in Moscow.

Robert Schumann was particularly fond of the title for lyrical piano pieces.

Georges Bizet's "Je crois entendre encore" from The Pearl Fishers (1863) is labelled a romance in the score.

Giuseppe Verdi's "Celeste Aida" from Aida (1871) is labelled romanza.

Franz Lehar's "Wie einen Rosenknospe" from "The Merry Widow" is labelled "Romance".

Works with voice parts 
Lieder by Franz Schubert:
  114, "Romanze" ['Ein Fräulein klagt’ im finstern Turm'] for voice and piano (1814; 2 versions)
 D 144, "Romanze" ['In der Väter Hallen ruhte'] for voice and piano (1816, sketch)
 D 222, "Lieb Minna" ['Schwüler Hauch weht mir herüber'] for voice and piano (1815, also appears as "Lieb Minna. Romanze")
 D 907, "Romanze des Richard Löwenherz" ['Großer Taten tat der Ritter fern im heiligen Lande viel'] for voice and piano (1826?, two versions, 2nd version is Op. 86)
 "Romanze", No. 3b of Schubert's Rosamunde
 Wilhelm Killmayer: Romanzen (1954)

Romances sans paroles 

So many composers in the French tradition wrote Romances sans paroles, "Romances without words", from the 1840s onwards that the radical poet Paul Verlaine in turn published a collection of his impressionistic poems as Romances sans paroles (1874).

Russian romance 

During the 19th century Alexander Alyabyev (1787–1851), Alexander Varlamov (1801–48) and Alexander Gurilyov (1803–58) developed the French variety of the romance as a sentimental category of Russian art song. Black Eyes is perhaps the best known example. Among other notable examples of the Russian Romance are Shine, Shine, My Star and Along the Long Road.

British singer Marc Almond is the only Western artist to receive acclaim in Western Europe as well as in Russia for singing English versions of Russian romances and Russian chanson on his albums Heart on Snow and Orpheus in Exile.

Notes

References
  Henri Gougelot, La Romance française sous la Révolution et l'Empire : choix de textes musicaux (Melun:Legrand & Fils, 1937) [2nd ed., 1943]
  Henri Gougelot, Catalogue des romances françaises parues sous la Révolution et l'Empire, les recueils de romances (Melun:Legrand & Fils, 1937)
Russian romances on YouTube

External links
Jean-Luc Perrot plays the Romance from l’Art du facteur d’orgues, Dom Bedos de Celles on the organ François-Henri Clicquot, Souvigny
Romances at The LiederNet Archive

 
Classical music styles